The European Forest Fire Information System (EFFIS) supports the services in charge of the protection of forests against fires in the EU and neighbor countries and provides the European Commission services and the European Parliament with updated and reliable information on wildland fires in Europe.

Since 1998, EFFIS is supported by a network of experts from the countries in what is called the Expert Group on Forest Fires, which is registered under the Secretariat General of the European Commission. Currently, this group consists on experts from 43 countries in European, Middle East and North African countries. 
In 2015, EFFIS became one of the components of the Emergency Management Services in the EU Copernicus program.

See also  
 List of wildfires#Europe

External links  
A number of specific applications are available through EFFIS:
 Current Situation Viewer (online)
 Firenews (current sitiuation)
 Long-term monthly fire weather forecast (online )
 Long-term seasonalfire weather forecast (online )
 Data and services (online)

References 

General Services in the European Commission
Firefighting
Forest ecology
Wildfires